The Zeebrugge Hub is the natural gas physical trading point in Zeebrugge, Belgium.  It is connected to the National Balancing Point (UK) via the Interconnector.

References

See also
 Glossary of terms used in the trading of oil and gas,utilities and mining commodities

Natural gas trading hubs
Natural gas in Belgium
Zeebrugge